Mateo Agustín Coronel (born 24 October 1998) is an Argentine professional footballer who plays as an attacking midfielder for Atlético Tucumán, on loan from Argentinos Juniors.

Career
Coronel spent the majority of his youth career with Social Ramallo, prior to moving to Newell's Old Boys' system at the age of sixteen. Coronel left the latter in 2016, subsequently joining Defensores de Belgrano; a squad he shared with his brother. He made his Torneo Federal A debut on 4 September 2016 against Rivadavia, but would leave the game early after receiving a red card in stoppage time; despite only coming on with fourteen minutes left. Coronel scored his first senior goal on 24 September 2017 away to Unión Sunchales, before netting a brace in an eventual 5–0 win a week later against Douglas Haig.

After forty total appearances for Defensores de Belgrano, Coronel departed to Primera División outfit Argentinos Juniors in July 2019; having not featured in the preceding seven months due to contractual disagreements between him and Defensores. Coronel didn't appear at first-team level for Argentinos in 2019–20, though was on the substitutes' bench once for a defeat to Vélez Sarsfield in March 2020. His debut for the club eventually arrived later that year on 31 October, with the forward playing for eighty-three minutes of a goalless draw with San Lorenzo in the Copa de la Liga Profesional. On 8 July 2022, Coronel joined fellow league club Atlético Tucuman on loan until December 2023, free of charge and with a purchase option.

Personal life
Coronel has other footballers in his family. His brother, Franco, started his senior career with Defensores de Belgrano, while sister Emilia played for Social Ramallo. Their father, Lucho, also played football in the Ramallo area.

Career statistics
.

Notes

References

External links
 
 
 

1998 births
Living people
Sportspeople from Buenos Aires Province
Argentine footballers
Association football midfielders
Torneo Federal A players
Defensores de Belgrano de Villa Ramallo players
Argentinos Juniors footballers
Atlético Tucumán footballers